The Charles R. Wilber School (also formerly Sharon High School) is a historic school building at 75-85 South Main Street in Sharon, Massachusetts.  Located on a block facing Sharon Town Hall, the large two story brick Colonial and Classical Revival building was built in 1921-22 and enlarged in 1928–29.  The older portion of the building, now the south building, was constructed to serve as an elementary school, and was named the Charles R. Wilber School.  The 1928 enlargement, including the north wing and the shaft of the T-shaped structure, were done to convert the building to a high school.  The building served as Sharon's high school until 1957, after which it became an intermediate school.  In 2009 a new wing was added to the building, and it was converted to residential use.

The building was listed on the National Register of Historic Places in 2010.

The Sharon DPW toured the abandoned building in 2002, which was uploaded to YouTube in 2011.

See also
National Register of Historic Places listings in Norfolk County, Massachusetts

References

National Register of Historic Places in Norfolk County, Massachusetts
Colonial Revival architecture in Massachusetts
School buildings completed in 1922
1922 establishments in Massachusetts